FC Kosmos Saint Petersburg was a Russian football team from Saint Petersburg. It played professionally in 1946, 1947 and from 1989 to 1993. The best result was 13th place in the second-tier Center Zone of the Soviet Second Group in 1947.

Team name history
 1911–1914: FC Putilovskiy St. Petersburg
 1914–1923: FC Putilovskiy Petrograd
 1924: Moskovsky-Narvsky Rayon Team Leningrad
 1925–1934: FC Krasny Putilovets Leningrad
 1935–1946: FC Kirovsky Zavod Leningrad
 1947: FC Dzerzhinets Leningrad
 1948–1961: FC Kirovsky Zavod Leningrad
 1962–1991: FC Kirovets Leningrad
 1991: FC Kirovets St. Petersburg
 1992: FC Kosmos-Kirovets St. Petersburg
 1993: FC Kosmos St. Petersburg (dropped out of the league in September)

External links
  Team history by footballfacts

Association football clubs established in 1899
Defunct football clubs in Saint Petersburg
Association football clubs disestablished in 1993
1899 establishments in the Russian Empire
1993 establishments in Russia